Singapore Woman is a 1941 American drama film directed by Jean Negulesco and starring Brenda Marshall and David Bruce.

The Warner Bros. B picture is a remake of Dangerous (1935) using leftover sets from The Letter (1940). The story was based on Laird Doyle's short Hard Luck Dame.

Plot

Cast
Brenda Marshall as Vicki Moore
David Bruce as David Ritchie
Virginia Field as Claire Weston
Jerome Cowan as Jim North
Rose Hobart as Alice North
Connie Leon as Suwa

References

External links

1941 films
Films directed by Jean Negulesco
Films scored by Adolph Deutsch
Warner Bros. films
American black-and-white films
American romantic drama films
1941 romantic drama films
Remakes of American films
Films set in Singapore
Films based on short fiction
1940s English-language films
1940s American films